GSC Game World is a Ukrainian video game developer based in Prague. Founded in Kyiv in 1995 by Sergiy Grygorovych, it is best known for the Cossacks and S.T.A.L.K.E.R. series of games. GSC Game World was the first company in Ukraine to localize PC games to the Russian language. In 2002, it became a publishing house, GSC World Publishing.

History

Founding and early activity 
The company was founded in 1995 by Sergiy Grygorovych, who became chief executive officer (CEO). He came up with the company name and emblem while at school, in 1990, at age 12. "GSC" are the initials of his name in the transliteration "Grygorovych Sergiy Constantinovich". Later Grygorovych explained this decision:

By 1996, when Grygorovych was sixteen company employed fifteen people in a two-room apartment. Early employees included Grygorovych's younger brother, Evgeniy, and Andrew Prokhorov. The company was the first in Ukraine to translate video games into Russian, additionally creating multimedia CD-ROM encyclopedias.

Game development 
In 1997 the company started developing its first video game, but difficulties in development led to its quick abandonment.

In 1998, after the economic crisis in Russia, the GSC company reoriented to the Western market, developing real-time strategy games. GSC unsuccessfully tried to get a contract for the Warcraft 3 development with Blizzard Entertainment. According to the CEO, they were rejected due to Blizzard's distrust of Grygorovych's youth. By the end of 1998, the company finished its debut commercial game, WarCraft 2000: Nuclear Epidemic. It was powered by its own engine, which was subsequently reused by Cossacks: European Wars. Nuclear Epidemic distinguished itself from other strategy games of the time with its increased unit size limits. At the beginning of 1999, it was released for free online. They began development on another project titled DoomCraft, which was shuttered six months later in favor of the development of Cossacks.

Company debut 
In 2001, GSC Game World released the real-time strategy game for Windows, Cossacks: European Wars. It was the first game that brought the company financial success and global recognition. Later that year, GSC Game World released the tactical first-person shooter Codename: Outbreak and an expansion for Cossacks named Cossacks: The Art of War. In the same year, GSC began developing a story-driven shooter based on the Stargate series concept and Aztec architecture. It was powered by a custom X-Ray Engine, which rendered high-quality images and supported many modern technologies. The project was titled Oblivion Lost.

In 2002, the company released the combat hovercraft arcade racing game Hover Ace: Combat Racing Zone and another expansion to Cossacks called Cossacks: Back to War. At the end of that year, a new real-time strategy game named American Conquest was released. Also, in March 2002, after the GSC Game World company trip to the Chernobyl Exclusion Zone, the Oblivion Lost concept was wholly revised and used the Chernobyl disaster as a foundation. The game was called Stalker: Oblivion Lost, but soon the name changed to S.T.A.L.K.E.R.: Oblivion Lost, due to copyright complications with the word "Stalker". The rendering system was reworked. The game was scheduled to be released at the end of 2003.

In 2003, the company released the addition American Conquest: Fight Back and the first-person shooter FireStarter. Also, the development of the first-person shooter S.T.A.L.K.E.R.: Oblivion Lost continued, and THQ became its publisher. By their recommendation, S.T.A.L.K.E.R.: Shadow of Chernobyl became the official name that got the first accurate release date – the middle of 2004.

In 2004, GSC opened GSC World Publishing, a division that would publish GSC's games in countries of the Commonwealth of Independent States and in Europe. Together with Ubisoft on 20 November 2004, it published its own developed RTS game Alexander, the official game based on Oliver Stone's movie Alexander. The release of S.T.A.L.K.E.R.: Shadow of Chernobyl was postponed by THQ to 2005 due a transition to a new rendering process. In 2005, a sequel of the Cossacks strategy, Cossacks II: Napoleonic Wars, was released. In February 2005, the release of Shadow of Chernobyl was postponed indefinitely. In 2006, the company released an expansion for the Cossacks series titled Cossacks II: Battle for Europe, and a new real-time strategy role-playing game, Heroes of Annihilated Empires. The company released a statement that Shadow of Chernobyl should be released in the first quarter of 2007. At the beginning of the year, some GSC employees left the company to found 4A Games studio.

On 20 March 2007, S.T.A.L.K.E.R.: Shadow of Chernobyl was officially released. On 24 March 2007, S.T.A.L.K.E.R. held the eighth position in the sales charts for various platforms, and the first position among PC games according to the rating of British organization ELSPA. On 12 February 2008, 950 thousand copies in the CIS and 700 thousand copies elsewhere in the world were sold, which made S.T.A.L.K.E.R.: Shadow of Chernobyl the most successful project of GSC Game World to date.

The worldwide success of Shadow of Chernobyl pushed the company to develop its next project. On 5 December 2007, a mobile game, S.T.A.L.K.E.R. Mobile, was created by Qplaze in conjunction with GSC. On 22 August 2008, the stand-alone expansion S.T.A.L.K.E.R.: Clear Sky was released, a prequel for Shadow of Chernobyl. A sequel for Shadow of Chernobyl, S.T.A.L.K.E.R.: Call of Pripyat, was released on 2 October 2009, the third game in the series.

In 2009, GSC began work on S.T.A.L.K.E.R. 2. The company officially announced the game on 13 August 2010. During development, the company shrank from 200 employees to 50. It had previously been the largest video game developer in Eastern Europe. Financial services company Ernst & Young named Grygorovych Ukraine's "entrepreneur of the year" in February 2011. On 9 December 2011, the Ukrainian News Agency, published a message with a statement from GSC Game World CEO Sergiy Grygorovych that the company had dissolved. Development of the S.T.A.L.K.E.R. 2 game was discontinued. Grygorovych stated that he did so for personal reasons. Studio spokesperson Valentine Yeltyshev said that the studio's financial situation played a minor role in the dissolution.

Revival 
At the end of 2014, GSC Game World re-opened and announced that it was working on a new game. The company founder's brother Evgeniy Grygorovych became its new CEO. In May 2015, the company announced Cossacks 3, a remake of the first Cossacks game, including "all its original gameplay". The game was released on 20 September 2016 on Steam, after which, the game was finalized and updated.

On 15 May 2018, GSC re-announced S.T.A.L.K.E.R. 2: Heart of Chornobyl. The game is scheduled to be released in 2023, for Microsoft Windows and the Xbox Series X/S.

Russian invasion of Ukraine 
When the 2022 Russian invasion of Ukraine began, the GSC paused development on S.T.A.L.K.E.R. 2. The company used social media to urge fans and game journalists to donate to the Ukrainian Armed Forces and provided special accounts for donations. By May 2022, S.T.A.L.K.E.R. 2'''s development resumed after the team had been relocated to Prague, allowing them to continue working safely. One former GSC Game World developer, Volodymyr Yezhov, was killed in action near Bakhmut in December 2022.

 Games 

 Cancelled games 

 Game engines 
Vital Engine is a game engine created for Codename: Outbreak, and later used for the Xenus games series (Boiling Point: Road to Hell and White Gold: War in Paradise) and The Precursors game by the Ukrainian developer Deep Shadows.

X-Ray Engine is a game engine created for the S.T.A.L.K.E.R. games series. X-Ray uses the free physics engine Open Dynamics Engine elements.

 Legacy 
Studios formed by teams and members from the GSC studio:
 Deep Shadows was founded 30 August 2001 in Kyiv by Sergiy Zabaryansky and Roman Lut. Deep Shadows games use the Vital Engine, developed by the company's founders while at GSC.
 4A Games was founded 2 March 2006 by a S.T.A.L.K.E.R. concept art team member. The company's employees immediately started creating their debut project, Metro 2033: The Last Refuge. 4A Games later developed the Metro game series.
 Vostok Games was founded in 2012, after the temporary dissolution of GSC. The organization is developing and supporting the original post-apocalyptic online game Survarium. It also developed Fear the Wolves, a battle royale game released in 2019.
 West-Games was founded in 2012, originally under the name Union Studio, by chief executive officer Eugene Kim, who had formerly been GSC's team lead and software developer. Kim had worked on GSC's canceled browser-based S.T.A.L.K.E.R. Online massively multiplayer online game, while five other employees had worked on prior S.T.A.L.K.E.R. games. In 2013, Union Studio reorganized as West-Games, and in June 2014, the studio launched a crowdfunding campaign on Kickstarter for a supposed spiritual successor to S.T.A.L.K.E.R. called Areal. The campaign was highly criticized because of the game's trailer, which almost exclusively used footage from previous S.T.A.L.K.E.R. games. When asked to provide images from the game, representatives of West-Games presented screenshots of a landscape that was a slightly modified version of a pre-designed asset available for purchase on the "Asset Store" for the Unity game engine. Several parties, including the "MISERY" mod developer, stated that the project was a scam. Of the initially sought US $50,000, Areal raised almost $65,000, however, in July 2014, two days before its campaign closed, the project was suspended from Kickstarter, with Kickstarter citing guideline violations. West-Games initially claimed to have switched to private funding, though announced another crowdfunding campaign, this time on Wefunder, in December 2014, seeking $600,000 to produce a game called S.T.A.L.K.E.R.: Apocalypse. When GSC reformed, the studio stated that West-Games was legally not allowed to develop a S.T.A.L.K.E.R. game, as GSC held all rights to the franchise.
 Flying Cafe for Semianimals was founded in 2015 by the creative director Ilya Tolmachev, who was previously engaged in S.T.A.L.K.E.R.: Call of Pripyat. The company's debut game was Cradle''.

Notes

References

External links 

 
 Old website

Companies based in Kyiv
Privately held companies of Ukraine
Video game companies established in 1995
Video game companies of Ukraine
Video game development companies
Ukrainian companies established in 1995